John Roger may refer to:

John Roger (died 1441), MP for Bridport and Dorset
John Roger (died 1415), MP for New Romney

See also
John Pickersgill Rodger, British colonial administrator
John Rogers (disambiguation)
John-Roger Hinkins (1934–2014), American author, public speaker, and founder of the Movement of Spiritual Inner Awareness (MSIA)